DADIU (The National Academy of Digital, Interactive Entertainment) founded in 2005 is an academy located in Copenhagen and Aalborg in Denmark that educates students in the creation of computer games. The DADIU program is a collaboration between different universities and art schools in Denmark.

The DADIU Education and Program 
The DADIU program is a specialisation and educates future game developers in different fields of computer game development and video game development. The students participating in DADIU come from  universities and art schools in Denmark but are taught a joint curriculum. The DADIU programme is a full-time semester which take place each fall from August to December. Every fall semester DADIU accepts about 100 students to the program out of the many students who apply each year. The DADIU program contains both lectures, workshops, and game productions. During the three game productions with are the most important part of the DADIU program the students are divided into six teams which function as six real game studios. The students are accepted into a specific competence  as part of the DADIU program. Every fall semester the DADIU accepted six Game designers, six Game directors, six Project managers, six Level designers, six Audio designers, six Art directors, and a number of Game Programmers, CG Artists, QA & UX Managers, Visual designers, and Animators into the program.

The students thus complete their ongoing studies but also receive a diploma certifying to the industry that they have completed the training at the Academy.

The DADIU Members 
The students participating in DADIU come from the following art schools and universities which are all members of the DADIU program:

 Aalborg University (Interactive Digital Media, Computer Science and Medialogy)
 Aarhus University (Audio Design and Digital Design)
 IT University of Copenhagen
 Technical University of Denmark
 The National Film School of Denmark
 The Royal Danish Academy of Fine Arts - Schools of Architecture, Design and Conservation
 TRUEMAX Academy
 University of Copenhagen (DIKU - Computer Science and Film and Media Studies)
 VIA University College (The Animation Workshop)

The DADIU games from 2015 
 Game Changer 
 Space Bears 
 Uprise 
 Spoken 
 Blobbers 
 Clockwork Dream

The DADIU games from 2014 
The following games have been produced in connection with the DADIU program in 2014:

 Dragon Journey 
 Let's Raid 
 Scouts 
 Wonder Wool 
 Greedy Grablins 
 Cloud

The DADIU games from 2013 
The following games have been produced in connection with the DADIU program in 2013:
 My Fear and I 
 Sun Towers 
 Saviour of Asgard 
 Punish Panda 
 A Darker Shade of Red 
 The Printer Guy

The DADIU games from 2012 
The following games have been produced in connection with the DADIU program in 2012:

 Horizon 
 Trail of Regret 
 Hotah 
 Cantrip 
 Ion 
 Little Barker

The DADIU games from 2011 
The following games have been produced in connection with the DADIU program in 2011:

 Back to Bed 
 Wake Up Clone 
 A Mother's Inferno 
 Distorpia 
 Blackwell 
 Hell Driver

The DADIU Greenhouse program 
The  DADIU Greenhouse program functions as a pre-incubator program for former DADIU students and team who want to publish their games commercially and start a real game business or game studio. The DADIU Greenhouse program help former DADIU students and team half a year. The DADIU Greenhouse program provides meetings with mentors and experts from the games industry. This mentors and experts helps and advice the former DADIU students and team on business, strategy, finance, access to market, resource management, marketing, and PR.

The Award-winning games made during DADIU or by DADIU alumni 
Some of the award-winning games made by the students are:
 Back to Bed - SpilPrisen 2015 - The Jury's Special Mention
 Blendimals- SpilPrisen 2015 - The Showcase award

References

External links
DADIU's site

Education in Denmark